Crăiești is a commune in Mureș County, Transylvania, Romania. It is composed of four villages: Crăiești, Lefaia (Lefája), Milășel (Kisnyulas) and Nima Milășelului (Kisnyulasi Néma).

See also
List of Hungarian exonyms (Mureș County)

References

Communes in Mureș County
Localities in Transylvania